Alvis Vītoliņš (sometimes anglicised as Alvis Vitolins or Vitolinsh; 15 June 1946, in Sigulda – 16 February 1997) was a Latvian chess master.

Awarded the International Master title in 1980, he was Latvian Champion in 1973 (jointly), 1976, 1977, 1978, 1982, 1983 and 1985 (jointly).

His name is attached to the Vitolins Variation in the Sicilian Defence, Scheveningen Variation (1.e4 c5 2.Nf3 d6 3.d4 cxd4 4.Nxd4 Nf6 5.Nc3 e6 6.Bb5+) and the Vitolins Variation of the Sicilian Defence, Dragon Variation (1. e4 c5 2. Nf3 d6 3. d4 cxd4 4. Nxd4 Nf6 5. Nc3 g6 6.Bg5 Bg7 7. Bb5+).

He committed suicide by jumping onto the frozen ice of the Gauja river from a railway bridge in 1997.

Notable games 
 Lev Gutman vs Alvis Vitolinsh, USSR 1979, Nimzo-Indian Defense: Reshevsky Variation (E46), 0-1
 Alvis Vitolinsh vs Igor Viksni, Riga 1985, Russian Game: Cochrane Gambit, Center Variation (C42), 1-0

References

External links 
 

1946 births
1997 suicides
People from Sigulda
Latvian chess players
Soviet chess players
Chess International Masters
Chess theoreticians
Suicides by jumping in Latvia
20th-century chess players
1997 deaths